Willie Frank Zapalac (December 11, 1920 – May 18, 2010) was an American football coach.  He was the eighth head football coach  at Arlington State College—now known as the University of Texas at Arlington—serving for one season, in 1952, and compiling a record of 8–1–1.

Zapalac later coached at Texas A&M (where he attended school), Texas Tech, Oklahoma State, and the University of Texas and in the NFL at the St. Louis Cardinals, Buffalo Bills, and New Orleans Saints.

While at the University of Texas, he coached under Darrell Royal for 12 years. During that time, Texas won seven Southwest Conference (SWC) championships and two national championships. He was known for producing many offensive lines in the 'Wishbone' attack. For a period of five years at least one offensive lineman was named to All American teams (and two of those five have been inducted into the College Football Hall of Fame) and numerous players named to All-SWC teams.

Zapalac had two sons, Bill and Jeff, that played football at the University of Texas.

Zapalac played professionally for the Pittsburgh Steelers in 1947.  His son Bill (Willie Zapalac, Jr.) played professionally three seasons in the NFL for the New York Jets.

References

1920 births
2010 deaths
American football fullbacks
Basketball coaches from Texas
Buffalo Bills coaches
New Orleans Saints coaches
Oklahoma State Cowboys football coaches
Pittsburgh Steelers players
St. Louis Cardinals (football) coaches
Tarleton State Texans football coaches
Tarleton State Texans men's basketball coaches
Texas Longhorns football coaches
Texas–Arlington Mavericks football coaches
Texas A&M Aggies football coaches
Texas A&M Aggies football players
Texas Tech Red Raiders football coaches
People from Sealy, Texas
Players of American football from Texas
Sportspeople from the Houston metropolitan area